The California Courier is an English-language Armenian weekly newspaper published since 1958 in the United States. Its publisher is Harut Sassounian.

History

In 1958, The California Courier was founded in Fresno, California by George J. Mason (born Kevork Elmassian) and Reese Cleghorn. Unlike some other Armenian weekly newspapers in the United States, the Courier was published entirely in English and marketed to an audience and generation of Armenian-Americans whose primary language was not Armenian. The paper's mission was to shed light on recent developments within Armenian-American communities, encourage greater involvement within those communities, and address intracommunal issues impartially, without associating with or being sponsored by an Armenian diasporan political party.

As the Courier relocated from Fresno to Los Angeles in 1983, the mantle of editor-in-chief was passed to Harut Sassounian, who publishes the paper to this day.

See also
 History of the Armenian Americans in Los Angeles

References

External links
 The California Courier
The California Courier at Armeniapedia

Publications established in 1958
Weekly newspapers published in California
Armenian-American culture in California
1958 establishments in California